General elections were held in Panama on 2 May 1999, electing both a new President of the Republic and a new Legislative Assembly.

Results

President

National Assembly

References

Panama
General election
Elections in Panama
Presidential elections in Panama
Panama